"Tell Me" is a song written and performed by American hip hop duo Smilez & Southstar featuring uncredited vocals by Billy Lawrence for their studio album Crash the Party. "Tell Me" was released in 2002 as the album's second single to decent success and heavy airplay. To date, "Tell Me" is Smilez and Southstar's only and most successful single, earning the descriptor of "one-hit wonder." The song reached number 100 on Complexs list of the 100 best hip-hop one-hit category:smilwonders. The song's instrumental is based on a sample from the song "Stop, Look, Listen (To Your Heart)" performed by Diana Ross and Marvin Gaye. The music video was directed by Gregory Dark.

Charts

References

2002 singles
2002 songs
American hip hop songs
Pop-rap songs
Songs written by Billy Lawrence

Music videos directed by Gregory Dark